Parama Pujari is an Indian politician. She was elected to the Odisha Legislative Assembly as a member of the Indian National Congress.

References

Living people
Indian National Congress politicians
Women in Odisha politics
1954 births
Odisha MLAs 2000–2004
Odisha MLAs 1995–2000
Odisha MLAs 1985–1990
Odisha MLAs 1980–1985
21st-century Indian women politicians